Friedrich Gottfried is a given name. Notable people with the name include:

 Friedrich Bernhard Gottfried Nicolai (1793–1846), German astronomer
 Friedrich Gottfried Abel (1714–1794), German physician

Masculine given names
Compound given names